Stithians Reservoir is a reservoir situated just under a mile to the west of the village of Stithians, Cornwall, England, UK.

History
Work on the dam began on 19 July 1962, however work stopped shortly after due to excavations which revealed the site was over a large area of soft kaolinised granite, which would require expensive foundations. A new design was drawn up for the dam, which was the current arched design. The dam was opened on 13 October 1967 by Sir John Carew Pole, whilst the Bishop of Truro, Dr Maurice Key blessed the reservoir.

By the opening in 1967 the valley behind the dam was completely flooded, 274 acres of farmland and three country houses becamesubmerged. Two causeways were built to carry sections of roads that were flooded, one at the southern end and the other in the north western corner near the Golden Lion Inn.

Statistics
The dam is 41.5 m high and 244m wide. It was built at a total cost of £1,125,000 (£ equivalent as of ).

Usage

There is an Outdoor Activity Centre offering watersports facilities at Stithians Lake. Sailing, windsurfing, kayaking, SUP and canoeing activities available. Non sport activities include bird watching, fly fishing for trout & a campsite.

See also

 List of reservoirs and dams in the United Kingdom

References
Bill Scolding (2009) Five Walks around Wendron, Wendron Parish Council

Drinking water reservoirs in England
Landforms of Cornwall
Reservoirs in Cornwall